Price Bluff is a large cliff  northeast of Mount Mooney, standing near the head of Robison Glacier in the Queen Maud Mountains of Antarctica. Mapped by United States Geological Survey (USGS) from surveys and U.S. Navy air photos, 1960–64. Named by Advisory Committee on Antarctic Names (US-ACAN) for Lieutenant Robert P. Price, U.S. Navy, photographic officer who served as inflight observer on many photographic missions during Operation Deep Freeze 1965 and 1966.

References 

Cliffs of Marie Byrd Land
Queen Maud Mountains